Juan Carlos Manjarrez (born 1 December 1980) is a Mexican archer. He competed in the men's individual event at the 2000 Summer Olympics.

References

1980 births
Living people
Mexican male archers
Olympic archers of Mexico
Archers at the 2000 Summer Olympics
Sportspeople from Mexico City